Northern Blue may refer to:

Plebejus idas, a butterfly
Transdev Northern Blue, former bus operator in England